Giridih Lok Sabha constituency is one of the 14 Lok Sabha (parliamentary) constituencies in Jharkhand state in eastern India. This constituency covers parts of Giridih, Bokaro and Dhanbad districts.

Assembly segments
Presently, Giridih Lok Sabha constituency comprises the following six Vidhan Sabha (legislative assembly) segments:

Members of Parliament

Election results

2019

2014

2009

2004

1999

See also
 Giridih district
 List of Constituencies of the Lok Sabha

Notes

External links
Giridih lok sabha  constituency election 2019 result details

Lok Sabha constituencies in Jharkhand
Giridih district
Bokaro district